Pisanitsa Island is the rocky island in the Meade group off Archar Peninsula, the northwest extremity of Greenwich Island in the South Shetland Islands extending 270 m in southwest-northeast direction and 60 m wide.  The area was visited by early 19th century sealers.

The island is named after the settlement of Pisanitsa in Southern Bulgaria.

Location
Pisanitsa Island is located 1.26 km west by north of Duff Point, 120 m northeast of Cave Island and 3.6 km southeast of Pyramid Island.  British mapping in 1968 and Bulgarian mapping in 2009.

Maps
 Livingston Island to King George Island.  Scale 1:200000.  Admiralty Nautical Chart 1776.  Taunton: UK Hydrographic Office, 1968.
 L.L. Ivanov. Antarctica: Livingston Island and Greenwich, Robert, Snow and Smith Islands. Scale 1:120000 topographic map. Troyan: Manfred Wörner Foundation, 2009.  (Second edition 2010)
Antarctic Digital Database (ADD). Scale 1:250000 topographic map of Antarctica. Scientific Committee on Antarctic Research (SCAR). Since 1993, regularly upgraded and updated.

References
 Bulgarian Antarctic Gazetteer. Antarctic Place-names Commission. (details in Bulgarian, basic data in English)
 Pisanitsa Island. SCAR Composite Antarctic Gazetteer.

External links
 Pisanitsa Island. Copernix satellite image

Islands of the South Shetland Islands
Bulgaria and the Antarctic